Serge Monast (1945 – December 5, 1996) was a Canadian investigative journalist, poet, essayist and conspiracy theorist. He is known to English-speaking readers mainly for the originating the conspiracy theory Project Blue Beam, which concerns an alleged plot to facilitate a totalitarian world government by destroying traditional religions and replacing them with a new-age belief system using NASA technology.

Biography
In the 1970s and 1980s, Monast was a journalist, poet and essayist. He was an active member of the Social Credit Party of Canada.

In the early 1990s, he started writing on the theme of the New World Order and conspiracies hatched by secret societies, being particularly inspired by the works of William Guy Carr.

He founded the International Free Press Agency (AIPL, l' Agence Internationale de Presse libre), where he published most of his work on these themes, achieving some prominence with an interview on esotericist and ufologist Richard Glenn's TV show Ésotérisme Expérimental, in which he repeatedly warned his audience about the dangers of a World Government. He was interviewed by Glenn a number of times up to 1996.

In 1994, he published Project Blue Beam (NASA), in which he detailed his claim that NASA, with the help of the United Nations, was attempting to implement a New Age religion with the Antichrist at its head and start a New World Order, via a technologically simulated Second Coming of Christ. He also gave talks on this topic. Other conspiracy theorists have noted the similarity of Project Blue Beam to the plots of Gene Roddenberry's unreleased 1975 Star Trek movie treatment The God Thing and the 1991 Star Trek: The Next Generation episode Devil's Due.

In 1995, he published his most detailed work, Les Protocoles de Toronto (6.6.6), modelled upon The Protocols of the Elders of Zion, wherein he said a Masonic group called "6.6.6" had, for twenty years, been gathering the world's powerful to establish the New World Order and control the minds of individuals.

By 1995 and 1996, Monast said he was being hunted by the police and authorities for involvement in "networks of prohibited information." He had homeschooled his two children, who were then taken away and made wards of the state in September 1996 so that they would receive a public education. He died of a heart attack in his home in December 1996, at age 51, the day after being arrested and spending a night in jail. His followers claim his death was suspicious, suggesting he was assassinated by "psychotronic weapons" to keep from continuing his investigations, and that Jerry Fletcher, the Mel Gibson character in the 1997 film Conspiracy Theory, was modelled on him.

Copies of his works still circulate on the Internet, and have influenced such later conspiracy theorists as American evangelical preacher Texe Marrs. Some of his later works have been reissued by French publisher and conspiracy theorist Jacques Delacroix, along with others writing on the themes of Monast's conspiracy related work.

Publications

 Testament contre hier et demain. Manifeste de l'amour d'ici, self-published, 1973.
 Jean Hébert, Chartierville, self-published, 1974.
 Jos Violon: Essai d'investigation littéraire sur le comportement du Québécois,  self-published, 1975, 1977.
 (with Colette Carisse, Aimé Lebeau and Lise Parent) La famille: mythe et réalité québécoise, "Rapport présenté au Conseil des affaires sociales et de la famille", vol. 1, Conseil des affaires sociales et de la famille, 1974, 1976.
 L'Habitant, Éditions de l'Aube, 1979.
 L'Aube des brasiers nocturnes. Essai sur l'amour, Éditions de l'Aube, 1980.
 Cris intimes: poésie, Éditions de l'Aube, 1980.
 La Création irrécupérable: essai, Éditions de l'Aube, 1981.
 Méditations sur les dix commandements de Dieu, Éditions de l'Aube, 1983.
 La médaille de saint Benoît ou La croix de saint Benoît, Courrier de Saint Joseph, 1984?.
 Il est minuit moins quinze secondes à Ottawa: de l'impossible dualité canadienne à l'éclatement d'une Guerre civile, dossier d'enquête journalistique, La Presse Libre Nord-Américaine, 1992.
 "Présentation" de René Bergeron, Le corps mystique de l'antéchrist, Montréal, Presse libre nord-américaine, "Dossiers chocs", 1993 (reprint of 1941 book)
 Le gouvernement mondial de l'Antéchrist, journalisme d'enquête international, "La conspiration mondiale des Illuminatis", vol. 1, Éditions de la Presse libre, 1994. Reissued by Delacroix.
 The United Nations concentration camps program in America, "Coup d'État and war preparations in America", book 1, Presse libre nord-américaine, 1994.
 Vaccins, médecine militaire expérimentale, cristaux liquide, dossier d'enquête journalistique - CIA, Presse libre nord-américaine, 1994.
 Project Blue Beam (NASA), Presse libre nord-américaine [1994].
 Le Protocole de Toronto (6.6.6.). Québec année zéro, International free press agency, 1995.
 Le Contrôle total 666, Cahier d'Ouranos hors série, coll. "Enquêtes-Études-Réflexions" by Commission d'Études Ouranos. Reissued by Delacroix.
 Dévoilement du complot relatif au plan du chaos et de marquage de l´Humanité, Éditions Delacroix.
 Le Complot des Nations Unies contre la Chrétienté, Éditions Rinf, 1995.

Sources
 Pierre-André Taguieff, La Foire aux illuminés : Ésotérisme, théorie du complot, extrémisme, Paris, Mille et une nuits, 2005.
 Pierre-André Taguieff, L'imaginaire du complot mondial : Aspects d'un mythe moderne'', Paris, Mille et une nuits, 2006.

Notes

1945 births
1996 deaths
Canadian anti-communists
Canadian poets in French
Canadian male poets
Writers from Montreal
Journalists from Montreal
Anti-Masonry
Canadian conspiracy theorists
Christian conspiracy theorists
20th-century Canadian male writers
20th-century Canadian poets
Date of birth missing
Place of birth missing